Lopus is a genus of plant bugs in the family Miridae. There are at least three described species in Lopus.

Species
These three species belong to the genus Lopus:
 Lopus decolor (Fallén, 1807)
 Lopus longiceps (Flor, 1860)
 Lopus oculatus Dahlbom, 1851

References

Further reading

 
 
 

Phylinae
Articles created by Qbugbot